Elorza Airport  is an airport serving the town of Elorza in the Apure state of Venezuela. The runway is in the middle of the town.

The Elorza non-directional beacon (Ident: EZA) is located on the field.

See also
Transport in Venezuela
List of airports in Venezuela

References

External links
OpenStreetMap - Elorza
OurAirports - Elorza
SkyVector - Elorza

Airports in Venezuela